Mary Latimer, Nun is a 1920 British silent drama film directed by Bert Haldane and starring Malvina Longfellow, Warwick Ward and Ethel Fisher. The film is based on a novel by Eve Elwen. The screenplay concerns a girl from the slums who marries the son of an aristocrat.

Plot summary
A girl from the slums marries the son of an aristocrat. When he abandons her, she makes a living as a music hall performer.

Cast
 Malvina Longfellow as Mary Latimer  
 Warwick Ward as Alfred Pierpoint  
 Ethel Fisher as Clarice  
 George Foley as Sam Tubbs  
 H. Agar Lyons as Lord Pierpoint 
 Moore Marriott as Dickey Stubbs  
 Laurence Tessier
 Minnie Rayner

References

Bibliography
 Goble, Alan. The Complete Index to Literary Sources in Film. Walter de Gruyter, 1999.

External links

1920 films
1920 drama films
British silent feature films
British drama films
Films based on British novels
British films based on plays
Films set in England
Films directed by Bert Haldane
British black-and-white films
1920s English-language films
1920s British films
Silent drama films